Mabel Todd may refer to:

 Mabel Elsworth Todd (1880–1956), founder of what later came to be known as Ideokinesis, a form of somatic education
 Mabel Loomis Todd (1856–1932), American editor and writer
 Mabel Todd (actress), American actress